Monkstown Community School was a mixed non-denominational secondary school in Monkstown, County Antrim, Northern Ireland. It closed in 2015 when it merged with Newtownabbey Community High School to form Abbey Community College.

Curriculum
Key Stage 3 Curriculum

In years 8,9 and 10 al pupils follow the Northern Ireland Curriculum with Information Communication Technology integrated into all subjects at this level; 
in addition pupils have the opportunity to study personal and Social Education.  
Health education is promoted through the subjects of Home Economics and Science.

Subjects studied include;

English 
Mathematics 
Science 
History 
Geography 
Home Economics 
Physical Education 
Religious Education 
French 
Technology and Design 
Art 
Music 
Personal and Social Education

Key Stage 4 Curriculum

During Key Stage 4 (Year 11 and 12) all pupils will study the core subjects: English, Religious Education; Mathematics; Science and French in addition to Careers and Games.  Pupils will also study a group of optional subjects chosen from Geography, History, English Literature, Double Award Science, ICT, Technology and Design, Business Studies, Office Applications, Information Systems, Home Economics, Child Development, Music, Art and Physical Education.

The subjects pupils study will be based upon parent / pupil choices; pupils Key Stage 3 continuous assessment record; internal and external examinations in addition to recommendations from subject teachers.

Post 16 Sixth Form Curriculum

At present pupils have a choice of studying either Vocational “A” levels in Years 13 and 14 (Lower and Upper Sixth) or Intermediate level GNVQ
in Year 13 (Lower Sixth).

General National Vocational Qualifications (GNVQ)

Two-year GNVQ Advanced courses in Business Studies, ICT and Leisure and Tourism are offered presently.  A one-year course Intermedite level GNVQ
is offered in Business Studies.  Pupils will also study and have to demonstrate competence in the core skills of Information Technology, 
Application of Number and Communications.  They will be given the opportunity to develop skills in problem solving, working with others and 
improving their own learning and performance.

The range of post 16 courses on offer will depend on the number of pupils choosing a course together with our staffing resources within the school.

Special Educational Needs

Some pupils in the 11-18 age group have Special Educational Needs which must be catered for.  Monkstown Community School is a caring school 
which treats all pupils as individuals.

The School has a Moderate Learning Difficulties Unit with three specialist teachers who work with pupils, parents,
subject teachers and external agencies to ensure that the appropriate support is provided.  This includes

1:1 support 
Learning Assistants 
Reading Partnerships 
Small teaching groups 
Extra support in subject classes 
North Eastern Board personnel 
A range of teaching approaches to enable pupils to develop confidence and understanding.

All requirements of the Northern Ireland Code of Practice are met and parents are kept fully informed.

Statistics

Pupils

Average enrolment in 2005 – 2006 was 708

134 Year 8 pupils were admitted into the School in September 2005.

Enrolled Pupils: 777

Notable former pupils

References

External links

Secondary schools in County Antrim
Educational institutions established in 1976

1976 establishments in Northern Ireland
Defunct schools in Northern Ireland